Ervin Jose Massinga is an American diplomat who is the nominee to serve as United States ambassador to Ethiopia.

Education 
Massinga earned a Bachelor of Science degree from the Walsh School of Foreign Service at Georgetown University and a Master of Public Policy from the Evans School of Public Policy and Governance at the University of Washington.

Career 
A career member of the United States Foreign Service, Massinga has served in embassies in Pakistan, Sudan, Guinea, the Dominican Republic, Chile, Ivory Coast, and China. He was also assigned to the Bureau of African Affairs, Bureau of Economic and Business Affairs, Office of the United States Trade Representative, and Bureau of Intelligence and Research.

Ambassador to Ethiopia
On January 3, 2023, President Joe Biden nominated Massinga to be the ambassador to Ethiopia. His nomination is pending before the Senate Foreign Relations Committee.

Personal life
Massinga speaks French, Spanish, and Mandarin Chinese.

References 

Living people
American diplomats
Walsh School of Foreign Service alumni
Georgetown University alumni
Evans School of Public Policy and Governance alumni
University of Washington alumni
United States Foreign Service personnel
United States Department of State officials
Ambassadors of the United States to Ethiopia
Year of birth missing (living people)